Karin Hallas-Murula (before 2000 Karin Hallas; born in 1957 in Kiviõli) is an Estonian architecture historian.

In 1992 she finished her doctoral studies in Moscow.

1991-2010 she was the head of Estonian Architecture Museum.

She has researched mainly the late 19th and 20th century architecture, especially in Estonia.

She is a member of Europa Nostra's board.

Awards:
 2002 Order of the White Star, V class.

References

Living people
1957 births
Estonian art historians
Estonian women historians
Academic staff of the Tallinn University of Technology
Recipients of the Order of the White Star, 5th Class
People from Kiviõli